Rob Finnerty (born May 1, 1982) is a television news anchor and host, currently hosting the morning news/talk program Wake Up America on Newsmax TV.

Prior to joining Newsmax, Finnerty worked for WTSP in Tampa Bay as a morning news anchor. 

He also worked for one year at KCTV in Kansas City and KBAK-TV in Bakersfield.

He was born in Massachusetts and attended Fairfield University in Connecticut.  He is married with two children – a son and a daughter.

Controversies 
In November 2008, Finnerty was charged with homicide and operating under the influence after hitting and killing a pedestrian in Boston. The homicide charges were ultimately dropped when Suffolk District Attorney dismissed the charge when a collision analysis report showed there was no way any driver – impaired or sober – could have avoided striking the pedestrian when he stepped into the street, Finnerty pleaded guilty to OUI in November 2009.

On May 10, 2021, Finnerty made national headlines when he confronted former Obama speechwriter David Litt for trying to insert Newsmax criticisms during an interview about Elon Musk and Saturday Night Live.

On April 1, 2022, Finnerty interrupted his show with the false breaking news that "Russia has apparently surrendered" to Ukraine, then asking unaware guest Mark Halperin for his thoughts. When Halperin began to respond, Finnerty cut him off "to gleefully say that the whole thing was a prank" and mock Halperin for falling for it, upsetting fellow Newsmax employees behind the scenes, according to several news outlets.

References 

1982 births
Living people
Fairfield University alumni